Dubaj (also Romanized as Dūbāj) is a village in Aliabad-e Ziba Kenar Rural District, Lasht-e Nesha District, Rasht County, Gilan Province, Iran. At the 2006 census, its population was 157, in 46 families.

References 

Populated places in Rasht County